Berserker, also known as Berserker: Hell's Warrior, is a fantasy-action-horror film based on Norse mythology. It was written, directed and produced by Paul Matthews and had its main release in 2004.

Plot
The film begins with a voice-over by Barek who refers to a Norse legend. According to the saga, Odin was spurned by Brunhild. The irate Norse god chained her to an altar in Asgard, surrounded by a ring of eternal fire. He decreed that only a pure-hearted man could overcome the supernatural flames and save the alluring Valkyrie. Her saviour's fate should then be connected to hers forever. As Barek explains, he and his only brother learned about this as little boys and craved more and more to rescue the legendary beauty as they grew older.

As it is later on successively revealed by flashbacks, Boar eventually could not resist anymore and entered the ring of fire. Hereby he suffered severe burns. Barek followed him into the fire and remained wondrously unharmed. He unchained the Valkyrie and persuaded her to save Boar's life. Unfortunately her bite turned Boar into a cannibalistic Berserker.

When their father, Viking leader Thorsson is in need of reinforcements because he is in war with the Army of the Nord, he joins an alliance with the Berserkers who are now led by Boar. Following their combined campaign, they fight each other. Thorsson uses fire against the otherwise immortal Berserker Boar. Barek cannot bear see his brother burning and calls Odin for help. Odin complies with Barek's request but from now the fates of Barek, Boar, and Brunhilda are interlinked by a timeless curse.

Cast
 Paul Johansson as Barek 
 Craig Sheffer as Boar 
 Kari Wuhrer as Brunhilda/Anya
 Patrick Bergin as Thorsson

Reception
The film was called "over-ambitious" and even a "train wreck". The sounds of the valkyries reminded another critic of the "hissing" of his cat "when she sees another cat". In February 2018, the film was released with Rifftrax commentary.

References

External links
 
 

2004 films
English-language South African films
Films based on Norse mythology
2004 drama films
2004 fantasy films
2000s English-language films
Films directed by Paul Matthews